Rintaro Tokunaga (born December 29, 1987) is a Japanese professional basketball player who plays for Saga Ballooners of the B.League in Japan. He torn his left knee ACL on April 15, 2018. His nickname is "Rinrin".

Stats

Regular season 

|-
| align="left" | bj League 2011-12
| align="left" | Fukuoka
| 34 || 1 || 7.4 || 43.5 || 18.2 || 66.7 || 0.8 || 0.2 || 0.1 || 0.0 || 1.9
|-
| align="left" | bj League 2012-13
| align="left" | Fukuoka
| 49 || 0 || 9.4 || 42.5 || 34.1 || 78.6 || 0.7 || 0.5 || 0.5 || 0.0 ||2.0
|-
| align="left" | bj League 2013-14
| align="left" | Fukuoka
| 41 || 14 || 10.2 || 33.0 || 16.7 || 69.7 || 1.1 || 0.7 || 0.6 || 0.0 || 2.1
|-
| align="left" | bj League 2014-15
| align="left" | Fukuoka
| 44 || 23 || 19.3 || 36.0 || 16.7 || 53.7 || 1.8 || 2.1 || 1.1 || 0.1 || 3.8
|-
| align="left" | bj League 2015-16
| align="left" | Kyoto
| 44 || 2 || 7.8 || 55.1 || 28.6 || 57.5 || 0.9 || 0.7 || 0.4 || 0.0 || 2.3
|-
| align="left" | B2 2016-17
| align="left" | Kagawa
| 60 || 59 || 29.6 || 41.9 || 32.1 || 65.9 || 4.5 || 2.7 || 1.5 || 0.1 || 8.3
|-
| align="left" | B2 2017-18
| align="left" | Akita
|53 ||14  ||15.6  ||35.8  ||37.0  ||76.1  ||2.1  || 1.8 ||0.8  ||0.0  || 4.2 
|-
| align="left" | B3 2019-20
| align="left" | Saga
|18 ||2  ||17.3  ||33.9  ||25.9  ||63.2  ||1.3  || 1.1 ||0.8  ||0.0  || 3.2 
|-

Playoffs 

|-
|style="text-align:left;"|2011-12
|style="text-align:left;"|Fukuoka
| 2 ||  || 5.0 || .500 || .000 || .000 || 1.0 || 0.5 || 0.0 || 0.0 || 1.0
|-

Early cup games 

|-
|style="text-align:left;"|2017
|style="text-align:left;"|Akita
| 2 ||1 || 21.24 || .615 || .000 || .000 || 4.5 || 2.5 || 1.5 || 0.0 || 8.0
|-

References

External links
Official website

1987 births
Living people
Akita Northern Happinets players
Japanese men's basketball players
Kagawa Five Arrows players
Kyoto Hannaryz players
Rizing Zephyr Fukuoka players
Saga Ballooners players
Sportspeople from Fukuoka Prefecture
Point guards